The 2019 Coppa Ugo Agostoni was the 73rd edition of the Coppa Ugo Agostoni road cycling one day race. It was held on 14 September 2019 as part of the UCI Europe Tour as a 1.1-ranked event.

Teams
Twenty-five teams, which consisted of three UCI WorldTour teams, thirteen UCI Professional Continental teams, eight UCI Continental teams, and one national team, participated in the race. Each team could enter up to seven riders; however,  entered only six riders, and  entered only five. Of the 175 riders that started the race, only 57 riders finished.

UCI WorldTeams

 
 
 

UCI Professional Continental Teams

 
 
 
 
 
 
 
 
 
 
 
 
 

UCI Continental Teams

 
 
 
 
 
 Sangemini–MG.K Vis
 
 

National Teams

 Italy

Result

References

2019 UCI Europe Tour
2019 in Italian sport